Praproče is a settlement northwest of Gradnik in the Municipality of Semič in Slovenia. The area is part of the historical region of Lower Carniola. The municipality is now included in the Southeast Slovenia Statistical Region.

References

External links
Praproče at Geopedia

Populated places in the Municipality of Semič